Micha, or Miqie, is a Loloish language of Yunnan. Its usage is declining.

Classification
Micha ( or ) is most closely related to Lipo, Lolopo, and Lisu.

The autonym  is used by Lalo speakers, and should not be confused with Micha.

Distribution
Micha is spoken by about 9,000 persons in north-central Yunnan, in Wuding County, Luquan County, and Fumin County.

Wuding County: Shedianxiaocun, Yongtaoxiacun, Yongtaozhongcun, Yangliuhe, Maichacun, Wodudacun, Woduxincun, Shuiduifang, Shanjudacun, Shanjuxiacun, Yangjiacun, Luomian, Xiagubai, Yanziwo, Shudecun, Dacun, Xincun, Baisha, Dashiban, Puxi Xincun, Yangliuhe, Nanshancun, Maidishan, Daxinzhuang, Yangjiucun, Nuomizha, Bizu
Luquan County: Shanglaowu, Xiashihuiyao, Qinglongqing, Bailike, Yantang, Pingtian, Damituo, Xicun
Fumin County: Madishangcun, Madixiacun, Madishaocun

According to the Nanjian County Gazetteer (1993), Micha (密岔) is also spoken in Nanjian County, around Aliwu (阿里勿) and Santaishan (三台山), southeast of Dali.

References

Further reading 
Gao, Katie Butler. 2014. “Phonological Sketch and Classification of Micha: A Central Ngwi language of Yunnan.” Presented at the 47th International Conference on Sino-Tibetan Languages and Linguistics. Oct 2014. Yunnan Normal University. Kunming, China.
Gao, Katie B. 2015. "Assessing the Linguistic Vitality of Miqie: An Endangered Ngwi (Loloish) Language of Yunnan, China." Language Documentation & Conservation 9. 164-191.
Gao, Katie B. 2017. Dynamics of Language Contact in China: Ethnolinguistic Diversity and Variation in Yunnan. PhD Dissertation: University of Hawai‘i at Mānoa.
Nanjian County Gazetteer Commission [南涧县志编纂委员会编] (ed). 1993. Nanjian County Gazetteer [南涧彝族自治县志]. Chengdu: Sichuan Reference Press [四川辞书出版社].

External links 
 An open access collection of Micha recordings are available through Kaipuleohone.

Loloish languages
Languages of China
Endangered Sino-Tibetan languages